Fonda Speedway is a half-mile (0.8 km) dirt oval track located in Fonda, New York. The track hosted NASCAR Cup Series races in 1955 and 1966 to 1968. It is home to the Fonda 200. The track hosts Saturday night races with Modified, Sportsman, Limited Sportsman, Pro Stock, and 4 Cylinder classes (as of 2021).

History 
The track opened in 1953 as a half-mile dirt oval which it remains to this date. The track hosted NASCAR Cup Series races in 1955 and 1966 to 1968, two of which were one by Richard Petty, while David Pearson and Junior Johnson won the other two races. The track had an International Motor Contest Association (IMCA) class between 2000 and 2009. It switched to a United Midwestern Promoters (UMP) Modified class for one year in 2010. Brett Deyo took over as track promoter starting in 2019.

Drag Strip

From 1957 til 1968 the track was home to an 1/8 mile drag strip that ran in the middle of the track's infield. Shirley Muldowney debuted on the drag strip. Muldowney described the drag strip: "That strip was deadly, deadly. You would go down the center of that dirt oval and when you would sail off that strip onto the oval, all four wheels would leave the ground."

Notable alumni
Stewart Friesen - 2012, 2013, 2014, and 2015 track Modified champion
Shirley Muldowney

NASCAR Cup Series Results

reference:

References 

Motorsport venues in New York (state)
1953 establishments in New York (state)
Sports  venues completed in 1953

External links
Official website

NASCAR tracks